Cacomantis is a genus of cuckoo in the family Cuculidae. The genus name is derived from the Greek kakos meaning evil or ill-boding and mantis for prophet and is derived from their association with "rains" being supposed to be predicted as also ill fortune and bad weather. Most of them have a round nostril and are mainly in brown and gray colours. The tails are graduated and barred. The bars are transverse in sonneratii and oblique in all others.

Taxonomy
The genus Cacomantis was introduced in 1843 by the German naturalist Salomon Müller with the plaintive cuckoo as the type species. The genus name is from the Ancient Greek kakomantis meaning "prophet of doom".

Species
The genus contains ten species:
 Pallid cuckoo,  Cacomantis pallidus
 White-crowned cuckoo,  Cacomantis leucolophus
 Chestnut-breasted cuckoo, Cacomantis castaneiventris Fan-tailed cuckoo, Cacomantis flabelliformis Banded bay cuckoo, Cacomantis sonneratii Plaintive cuckoo, Cacomantis merulinus Grey-bellied cuckoo, Cacomantis passerinus Brush cuckoo, Cacomantis variolosus Rusty-breasted cuckoo, Cacomantis sepulcralis Moluccan cuckoo, Cacomantis aeruginosus''

References

 
Cuculidae
Bird genera
Taxa named by Salomon Müller
Taxonomy articles created by Polbot